Titus Otacilius Crassus was a Roman statesman who served as Consul in 261 BC.

References
 Thomas Robert Shannon Broughton: The Magistrates of the Roman Republic. Vol. 1, New York 1951, p. 204.

3rd-century BC Roman consuls
Year of birth unknown
Year of death unknown
Crassus